Pearl of the South Pacific is a 1955 American adventure film directed by Allan Dwan and written by Jesse L. Lasky, Jr. and Talbot Jennings. The film stars Virginia Mayo, Dennis Morgan, David Farrar, Murvyn Vye, and Lance Fuller. The film was released on July 4, 1955, by RKO Radio Pictures. It was based on a story by Anna Hunger.

Plot
Dan Merrill awakens on his boat after a night of drinking to find his former love, Rita Delaine, there with his partner, Bully Hague. Appealing to his greed, Rita and Bully coax him into coming along to an island where supposedly they can dive for a hidden treasure of rare black pearls.

On the island, high priest Michael, a white man, has a son, George, who is about to marry Momu, the daughter of Halemano, the native chief. The arrival of the boat carrying Dan, Rita, and Bully interrupts the wedding ceremony. Before the interlopers can be repelled, Rita poses as a missionary and George, who has never seen the outside world, persuades his father to welcome her to their isle.

After a prank during which her clothes are stolen, Rita ingratiates herself with the natives and infatuates George. He shows her a lagoon where the pearls can be found but refuses to dive, calling it taboo. Rita laughs and dives in, only to encounter a giant, deadly octopus.

Dan and Bully become more aggressive in seeking the pearls. Dan goes to the lagoon with George and together they slay the octopus. George does another dive for the pearls after making a deal with Bully for him to leave but Bully then stabs him in the back and takes the pearls. The natives come after the newcomers and kill Bully with a spear. Halemano also orders Rita to be put to death, but Dan rescues her. He gives back the pearls, however, and decides with Rita to remain there, living on the island, rather than sail away.

Cast 
Virginia Mayo as Rita Delaine
Dennis Morgan as Dan Merrill
David Farrar as Bully Hague
Murvyn Vye as Halemano
Lance Fuller as George
Basil Ruysdael as Tuan Michael
Lisa Montell as Momu

References

External links 
 

1955 films
Films directed by Allan Dwan
1955 adventure films
Films set on islands
Films set in Oceania
American adventure films
RKO Pictures films
1950s English-language films
1950s American films